WKTR is a contemporary Christian and religious formatted broadcast radio station licensed to Earlysville, Virginia, serving Charlottesville. WKTR is owned and operated by CSN International.

History
Baker Family Stations, then doing business as Rural Radio Service, was first issued a construction permit for 840 kHz in September 1986. WKTR signed on February 17, 1991, with a religious talk format. The station is a rimshot daytimer with a transmitter located near Stanardsville, Virginia.

By 2005, the station was still running religious talk under the branding "The Ministry Station". That March 1, it became the Charlottesville market's first ESPN Radio affiliate under the branding "ESPN 840 Charlottesville".

In 2010-11, WKTR flipped twice more: first to Southern gospel by joining the Joy FM network on June 30, 2010, then to country in a simulcast of WBNN-FM (105.3 MHz) in Buckingham County the next January 1.

Baker donated WKTR, by then valued at just $120,000, to CSN International on October 15, 2015. CSN is in the process of moving an FM translator from Eden, North Carolina to the Charlottesville antenna farm on Carter Mountain under the FCC's AM revitalization program.

References

External links
 CSN International Online

1991 establishments in Virginia
Contemporary Christian radio stations in the United States
Radio stations established in 1991
KTR
KTR
Albemarle County, Virginia